Jiři Balik (born 1953) is a Czech Agroscientist, University Professor and Rector of the Czech University of Life Sciences Prague (CULS).

Biography 
Balik was born in Tábor on November 30, 1953; he is married and has two children. The Professor of Agrochemistry and Plant Nutrition was 2010 until January 2018 Rector of the Czech University of Life Sciences Prague (CULS).

Higher education and academic career 
 1973–1978: Graduate studies at Faculty of Agronomy, University of Agriculture Prague
 1979–1982: Doctoral studies at Faculty of Agronomy, University of Agriculture Prague, Department of Agroenvironmental Chemistry and Plant Nutrition (AECPN)
 1982–1994: Scientific Assistant, Faculty of Agronomy, University of Agriculture Prague, Department of Agroenvironmental Chemistry and Plant Nutrition (AECPN)
 1994–2001: Associate Professor, Faculty of Agrobiology, Food and Natural Resources, Czech University of Agriculture Prague,  Department of Agroenvironmental Chemistry and Plant Nutrition (AECPN)
 From 2001: Professor of Agrochemistry and Plant Nutrition, Faculty of Agrobiology, Food and Natural Resources, Czech University of Agriculture Prague, Department of Agroenvironmental Chemistry and Plant Nutrition (AECPN)
 1994–1996: Deputy Head of Department of Agroenvironmental Chemistry and Plant Nutrition (AECPN), Faculty of Agrobiology, Food and Natural Resources, Czech University of Agriculture Prague
 1997–2000: Vice Dean for Studies & Didactics, Faculty of Agrobiology, Food and Natural Resources, Czech University of Agriculture Prague
 2000–2003: Vice Rector for Science and Research, Czech University of Agriculture Prague
 2003–2010: Vice Rector for University Estates & Communication with Specialists
 Since 2001: Head of Department of Agroenvironmental Chemistry and Plant Nutrition (AECPN), Faculty of Agrobiology, Food and Natural Resources, Czech University of Agriculture Prague (from 2007 Czech University of Life Sciences Prague)
 Since 2010: Rector, Czech University of Life Sciences Prague
 2017 University of Natural Resources and Life Sciences, Vienna Appoints Jiri Balik Dr. h.c.

Specialisation 

Plant nutrition with focus on issues related to nitrogen, phosphor, sulphur, transfer of elements and matter in the rhizosphere, new methods in fertiliser applications (CULTAN), management of waste in agricultural production. Resolver and co-resolver of a number of national projects (e.g. Czech Grant Agency, National Agency for Agricultural Research) and international projects (e.g. COST, EUREKA, Socrates, Gruntvig, EHP Norway). Research outcomes published mainly in Peer Reviewed Journals with Impact Factor (e.g. Plant & Soil; Plant, Soil, & Environment; Ecotoxicology & Environmental Safety; Chemosphere, etc.). Author of a monographic publication: “Transfer of elements and matter in the rhizosphere”.

 Title of PhD Thesis: Contribution to Balance of Nitrogen in Soil (15N) and its Utility for Plants
 Title of Associate Professor Dissertation: Ions Interaction in Soil Solution in Connection with Yield and Quality of Fodder Oats and Silage Maize
 Professor Nomination in Subject Area: Agrochemistry and Plant Nutrition

International study and teaching assignments 
 Rheinische Friedrich-Wilhelms-Universität Bonn
 Justus-Liebig-Universität Gießen
 Humboldt Universität zu Berlin
 Institute of Soils Sciences and Photosynthesis USSR Academy of Sciences, Pushchino na Oke

Didactic assignments 
 Head, PhD Subject Area Commission – General Plant Production, Faculty of Agrobiology, Food and Natural Resources, Czech University of Agriculture Prague
 Member, PhD Subject Area Commission, Faculty of Agriculture, South Bohemian University, Budweis; PhD Subject Area Commission, Faculty of Agronomy, Mendel University of Agriculture and Forestry, Brno.
 Guarantor, BSc and MSc courses in plant nutrition and fertilisers use.
 Supervisor, BSc and MSc Thesis, PhD students

Membership on scientific boards 
 Czech University of Life Sciences Prague
 Faculty of Agrobiology, Food and Natural Resources, Czech University of Life Sciences Prague
 Faculty of Agriculture, South Bohemian University, Budweis
 South Bohemian University, Budweis
 Mendel University of Agriculture and Forestry, Brno.
 Veterinary and Pharmacology University, Brno
 Slovak University of Agriculture, Nitra, Slovakia
 Technical University in Zvolen, Slovakia
 Plant Production Research Centre, Prague - Ruzyně
 Bioindicator and Revitalisation Centre, Prague

Publication indicators 
 Number of scientific papers cited on the Web of Science – 96
 Number of citations in the Science Citation Index – 268
 Hirsch Index - 12

References

External links 
 Bio (Czech) at Czech University of Life Sciences Prague

Living people
Scientists from Prague
Czech agronomists
Academic staff of the Czech University of Life Sciences Prague
1953 births